Legislative election were held in Russia on 7December 2003. At stake were the 450 seats in the State Duma (Gosudarstvennaya Duma), the lower house of the Federal Assembly.

As expected, the  pro-Vladimir Putin United Russia party received the most votes (38%) and won the most seats. The Communist Party remained the second largest, though much reduced in strength. The Liberal Democratic Party improved its position by 19 seats, while the liberal Yabloko and the liberal-conservative Union of Right Forces lost most of their seats.

Results

References

External links
Election results – official information  

Legislative elections in Russia
Legislative
Russia
Russia
Legislative
4th State Duma of the Russian Federation
Election and referendum articles with incomplete results